Mary Ellmann (née Donoghue) (1921–1989) was an American writer and literary critic. Magazines she reviewed for included The New York Review of Books, The Nation, Encounter, The Atlantic Monthly, Commentary, The New Republic, the New Statesman and The American Scholar.

Ellmann is particularly noted for her book of essays, Thinking About Women (1968), which discusses the evolution of the representation of femininity in British and American literature, exhibiting sexual analogies and stereotypes from the texts and contrasting criticism by male and female authors. The literary historian Mary Eagleton cited Ellmann's book as one of two "significant texts" in early feminist theory. The work has been widely cited for its introduction of the concept "phallic criticism" as applied to writers of both sexes. In a review of academic studies of gender, Mary Poovey described Thinking About Women as an example of the "earliest U.S. incarnation" of feminist literary criticism, which, "with the excitement of pioneers discovering virgin territory... helped make writing about women academically acceptable."

Ellmann was born in Newburyport, Massachusetts. She attended the University of Massachusetts and Yale University, and married the literary critic Richard Ellmann in 1949. The couple had three children, Stephen, Maud, and Lucy.

Notes

References

External links
 Mary Ellmann, WorldCat Authority Page.

1921 births
1989 deaths
Writers from Newburyport, Massachusetts
University of Massachusetts alumni
Yale University alumni
American literary critics
Women literary critics
American women essayists
20th-century American women writers
20th-century American essayists
20th-century American journalists
American women critics